This is a list of Quebecers who have performed as comedians on stage, on television, or on the radio.

This list also includes Acadian humorists and Franco-Canadian humorists who have mostly worked in Quebec. These humorists are marked with an asterisk (*).

A 
 Marc-Antoine Audette (Justiciers masqués)

B 
 Rachid Badouri
 Alexandre Barrette
 Michel Barrette
 Michel Beaudet
 Michel Beaudry
 Emmanuel Bilodeau
 Claude Blanchard
 Bruno Blanchet
 Anne-Élisabeth Bossé
 Bowser and Blue
 Pierre Brassard (Les Bleu Poudre)
 Normand Brathwaite (Samedi de rire)
 Benoît Brière

C 
 Fabien Cloutier
 Véronique Cloutier
 Michel Côté (Broue)
 Michel Courtemanche

D 
 Gabriel D'Almeida Freitas
 Clémence DesRochers
 Yvon Deschamps
 Jacques Desrosiers (Patof)
 Véronic Dicaire*
 Ding et Dong
 Martin Drainville (Broue)
 Sébastien Dubé (Les Denis Drolet)
 André Ducharme (Rock et Belles Oreilles)
 Yvan Ducharme
 Mathieu Dufour
 Marc Dupré

F 
 Marc Favreau (Sol)
 Simon-Olivier Fecteau (Les Chick'n Swell)
 Denise Filiatrault

G 
 André-Philippe Gagnon
 Émile Gaudreault (Le Groupe sanguin)
 Cathy Gauthier
 Marcel Gauthier (Broue)
 Daniel Grenier (Les Chick'n Swell)
 Frank Grenier
 Olivier Guimond

H 
 Louis-José Houde
 Patrick Huard

J 
 Mario Jean

K 
 Anthony Kavanagh
 Eddy King

L 
 Pierre Labelle
 Marc Labrèche
 Léane Labrèche-Dor
 Mado Lamothe
 Bruno Landry (Rock et Belles Oreilles)
 Jean Lapointe (Les Jérolas)
 Gilles Latulippe
 Michel Lauzière
 Pierre Légaré
 Claude Legault
 Guy A. Lepage (Rock et Belles Oreilles)
 Doris Lussier

M 
 Norm Macdonald
 Peter MacLeod
 Claudine Mercier
 Jean-François Mercier
 Marc Messier (Broue)
 Claude Meunier (Ding et Dong, Paul et Paul)
 Dominique Michel
 Louis Morissette (Les Mecs comiques)

N 
 Michel Noël

O 
 Rose Ouellette (La Poune)

P 
 Laurent Paquin
 Yves P. Pelletier (Rock et Belles Oreilles)
 François Pérusse
 Martin Petit (Les Bizarroïdes)
 Arthur Petrie*
 La Poune
 Brigitte Poupart (Les Zapartistes)

R 
 Caroline Rhea
 Judi Richards
 Rock et Belles Oreilles
 Stéphane Rousseau
 Alex Roy
 Stéphane E. Roy (Les Bizarroïdes)
 Phil Roy

S 
 Sugar Sammy
 Derek Seguin

T 
 Serge Thériault (Ding et Dong, Paul et Paul)
 Denis Trudel (Les Zapartistes)
 Sébastien Trudel (Justiciers masqués)

W 
 Mike Ward

References

 
comedians